MD-6 or MD6 may refer to:
 MD6, a cryptographic hash function
 Maryland's 6th congressional district
 Maryland Route 6